Kisela Jabuka is a village in Ǵorče Petrov Municipality within Greater Skopje, North Macedonia. It is located between the villages of Volkovo and Novo Selo.

As of the 2021 census, Kisela Jabuka had 1,317 residents with the following ethnic composition:
Macedonians 1,265
Serbs 28
Persons for whom data are taken from administrative sources 18
Others 6

References

External links 
 Official website

Villages in Ǵorče Petrov Municipality